The 2010–11 SM-liiga season was the 36th season of the SM-liiga, the top level of ice hockey in Finland, since the league's formation in 1975. The title was won by HIFK who defeated Espoo Blues in the finals. The title was 7th in team history.

Teams

 Head coaches listed with asterisk (*) were mid-season replacements.

Regular season

Each team played four times against every other team (twice home and twice away), getting to 52 games. Additionally, the teams were divided to two groups, where teams would play one extra game. One group included Blues, HIFK, Jokerit, JYP, KalPa, Pelicans and SaiPa, while other had HPK, Ilves, Kärpät, Lukko, Tappara, TPS and Ässät.

New addition to schedule was two games where teams could choose the opponents. These were played back-to-back in late January and the choices were made in December, with team with lowest point total to that date was able to choose first. These pairs were: TPS-Ilves, Pelicans-KalPa, SaiPa-Tappara, Kärpät-Blues, Jokerit-HIFK, Lukko-Ässät and HPK-JYP.

Playoffs

Wild card round (best-of-three)

HPK – Ilves 0–2
HPK-Ilves 3–5
Ilves-HPK 5–2

Kärpät – Blues 1–2
Kärpät-Blues 2–3 (OT)
Blues-Kärpät 3–5
Kärpät-Blues 1–2 (OT)

Quarterfinals (best-of-seven)

JYP – Ilves 4–0
JYP-Ilves 7–3
Ilves-JYP 1–2
JYP-Ilves 4–3
Ilves-JYP 2–3
Ässät – Blues 2–4
Ässät-Blues 3–4 (OT)
Blues-Ässät 3–0
Ässät-Blues 1–2
Blues-Ässät 1–5
Ässät-Blues 2–0
Blues-Ässät 3–0
HIFK – Jokerit 4–3
HIFK-Jokerit 0–1
Jokerit-HIFK 4–2
HIFK-Jokerit 2–1
Jokerit-HIFK 2–3 (OT)
HIFK-Jokerit 1–3
Jokerit-HIFK 1–2 (OT)
HIFK-Jokerit 5–1
Lukko – KalPa 4–3
Lukko-KalPa 2–3
KalPa-Lukko 3–0
Lukko-KalPa 2–1
KalPa-Lukko 2–5
Lukko-KalPa 5–0
KalPa-Lukko 3–2 (2OT)
Lukko-KalPa 5–1

Semifinals (best-of-seven)
JYP – Blues 1–4
JYP-Blues 1–3
Blues-JYP 4–3
JYP-Blues 4–2
Blues-JYP 2–0
JYP-Blues 1–3

HIFK – Lukko 4–1
HIFK-Lukko 2–3 (3OT)
Lukko-HIFK 1–3
HIFK-Lukko 5–2
Lukko-HIFK 0–3
HIFK-Lukko 7–1

Bronze medal game
JYP-Lukko 2–4

Finals (best-of-seven)
HIFK-Blues 4–0
HIFK-Blues 3–2
Blues-HIFK 1–5
HIFK-Blues 5–3
Blues-HIFK 2–4

1
Finnish
Liiga seasons